Italy competed at the 1906 Intercalated Games in Athens, Greece. 76 athletes, all men, competed in 37 events in 9 sports.

Athletics

Track

Field

Cycling

Diving

Fencing

Gymnastics

Rowing

Shooting

Swimming

Weightlifting

References

Nations at the 1906 Intercalated Games
1906
Intercalated Games